The NSW Premier's Multicultural Communication Awards (PCMAs), formerly Multicultural Media Awards, Multicultural and Indigenous Media Awards (MIMA) and NSW Premier's Multicultural Media Awards, are Australian journalism awards held each year at New South Wales Parliament.

History
The Multicultural Media Awards were founded by Lebanese-born Australian Parliamentarian Shaoquett Moselmane. They were established in 2012 to recognise outstanding journalism covering multicultural issues in Australia. To clarify an equal onus on Indigenous media, the awards were formally amended in 2014 to include Indigenous in the title.

In 2017 they were called the NSW Premier's Multicultural Media Awards, and in 2022 the name was NSW Premier's Multicultural Communication Awards.

Description
According to the website , the NSW Premier's Multicultural Communications Awards, or PMCAs, "recognise excellence in the multicultural media and marketing industry".

Media Awards 2012

 Journalist of the Year - joint winners: Pawan Luthra and Majida Abboud
 Coverage of Community Affairs Abroad - Tammy Lee
 Coverage of Indigenous Affairs - Gerry Georgatos (National Indigenous Times)
 Editorial/News Reporting - Pawan Luthra
 Investigative Reporting/Feature Writing - Gerry Georgatos
 Contribution to Social Inclusion and Multiculturalism - Lina Lee
 Photographer of the Year - Jojo Lee
 Online Innovation in News Blog or News Website Design - Pawan Luthra

Media Awards 2013

 Journalist of the Year - Gerry Georgatos
 Coverage of Community Affairs in Australia - Linna Lee
 Coverage of Indigenous Affairs - Gerry Georgatos
 Investigative Reporting - Gerry Georgatos
 Photographer of the Year - Jojo Lee
 Online Coverage - Steve Giannakouras
 Feature Writing - Helen Velissanis 
 News Reporting - Tammy Lee
 Contribution to Social Inclusion - Jan Smith
 Online Innovation of News Blog or News Website Design - Pawan and Rajni Luthra
 Editorial Cartoon - Joel Mapayo
 Hall of Fame - Syed Zafar Hussain Shah

Media Awards 2014 
 Journalist of the Year - joint winners: Malarndirri McCarthy and Kumud Merani
 Editorial Reporting - joint winners: Marcus Woolombi Waters and Gerry Georgatos
 
 Photographer of the Year - joint winners: Romeo Cayabyab and Freedy Handa
 News Reporting - joint winners: Geoff Bagnall and Maja Jovic
 Coverage of Community Affairs - Lok Hei Lai
 Online News Coverage - Mohamad Taha
 Hall of Fame - Paolo Rajo

Media Awards 2015 
 Journalist of the Year - Natalie Ahmat
 Coverage of Community Affairs - Violi Calvert
 Young Journalist of the Year - Arijit Banarjee
 Photographer of the Year - Sachin Wakhare
 New Reporting - Pawan Luthra
 Online News Coverage - Shant Soghomonian
 Editorial Reporting - Margherita Angelucci
 Encouragement Award - Natalie Sukkarieh
 Hall of Fame - Anwar Harb
 Hall of Fame - Sachin Wakhare

Media Awards 2016 

 Journalist of the Year - Susana Lolohea and Usha Arvind 
 Young Journalist of the Year - Nami Gohil
 Coverage of Community Affairs - Raymond Selvaraj
 Editorial Reporting - Mike Sweet
 News Reporting - Laura Murphy-Oates
 Online News Coverage - Ana Sevo
 Photographer of the Year - Nerses Baliozian

External links

References 

Australian journalism awards